Elizabeth Starkie (born 31 August 1938) is a British former tennis player. She became Elizabeth Wagstaff after marriage. Active during the 1960s, Starkie represented Great Britain in both Federation Cup and Wightman Cup tennis.

Starkie, a native of Yorkshire, competed in the Wightman Cup from 1962 to 1966 and was the doubles partner of Ann Jones in Britain's run to the semi-finals of the 1966 Federation Cup. She was a singles quarter-finalist at the 1963 Australian Championships, where she also reached the semi-finals in doubles.

References

External links
 
 

1938 births
Living people
English female tennis players
British female tennis players
Tennis people from West Yorkshire